Salvatore Meleleo (24 July 1929 – 2 August 2018) was an Italian politician.

Meleleo was born in Corigliano d'Otranto and trained as a surgeon. Affiliated with Christian Democracy, he served as mayor of Lecce between July 1977 to May 1983, and again from September 1985 to January 1986. Meleleo's mayoralty was followed by four terms in the Chamber of Deputies, from 1983 to 1994.  He represented the Union of the Centre in the Senate from 2001 to 2006. Outside of politics, Meleleo ran a company that distributed mineral water.

References

1929 births
2018 deaths
Union of the Centre (2002) politicians
Christian Democracy (Italy) members of the Chamber of Deputies (Italy)
Italian surgeons
Senators of Legislature XIV of Italy
Deputies of Legislature IX of Italy
Deputies of Legislature X of Italy
Deputies of Legislature XI of Italy
Mayors of Lecce
20th-century Italian businesspeople
21st-century Italian businesspeople
20th-century surgeons